BB6 can refer to:

BB6, a postcode district in the BB postcode area
Chassis code for the 5th Generation Honda Prelude (1997-2001), other codes include BB5, BB7, BB8
Big Brother 6, a television programme in various versions